The 2000 Marlboro Masters of Formula 3 was the tenth Masters of Formula 3 race held at Circuit Park Zandvoort on 6 August 2000. It was won by Jonathan Cochet, for Signature.

Drivers and teams

Classification

Qualifying

Group A

Group B

Race

References

Masters of Formula Three
Masters of Formula Three
Masters
Masters of Formula Three